Uno No Es Uno is the second album by Argentine singer Noel Schajris released on October 13, 2009.

Track listing

 Momentos
 No Veo La Hora
 A Un Minuto del Sol
 Nadie Me Hace Más Feliz Que Tú (feat. Yuridia)
 No Importa (feat. John Legend)
 Quién Necesita Mirar
 Aunque Duela Aceptarlo (feat. Luis Fonsi)
 Nadie Se Va a Marchar
 Gracias Por Entrar
 Lejos
 Hay Luna Nueva
 Regresar (Bonus Track)
 No Importa (Bonus Track)

Certifications

References

2009 albums
Noel Schajris albums